Party Game was a Canadian television game show in the 1970s, produced by Hamilton independent station CHCH-TV from 1970 to 1981. It aired throughout Canada in syndication, broadcast on 32 stations at its peak.

The show featured two teams of three players in a charades competition: the Challenger Team was composed of a contestant joined with two guest star players, while the Home Team consisted of series regulars Jack Duffy, Dinah Christie and Billy Van. Using game play similar to the American game show Pantomime Quiz, answers were usually jokes or complex phrases involving a pun or some other form of word play (example: "Tiny Tee Hee.... "I didn't raise my daughter to be fiddled with," said the pussycat as she rescued her offspring from the violin factory"). Viewers at home were also invited to send their own joke or phrase, which if used, could win them a small prize.

The show premiered on CHCH in 1970. In its first season the show was hosted by Al Boliska, who was succeeded in 1971 by Bill Walker. Walker hosted for the remainder of the show's run.

Party Game was produced by Riff Markowitz, the executive producer and star of The Randy Dandy Show and executive producer of The Hilarious House of Frightenstein. Writers for the series included Paul K. Willis and Michael Boncoeur.

The set was a simple living room type with couches and a few wall pictures and pieces.

The voice-over announcer who announced each charade was credited as "Gardiner Westbound", a nod to a stretch of the Gardiner Expressway in Downtown Toronto heading toward Hamilton, but was actually producer Markowitz.

References

External links

1970s Canadian game shows
1980s Canadian game shows
First-run syndicated television shows in Canada
Television shows filmed in Hamilton, Ontario
1970 Canadian television series debuts
1981 Canadian television series endings
1970s Canadian comedy television series
1980s Canadian comedy television series